Nikita Mirzani Mawardi (born 17 March 1986) is an Indonesian actress, model and host of television shows. She commenced her television career with an appearance on Take Me Out Indonesia and made her film debut as an extra in Lihat Boleh, Pegang Jangan (2010). Known for her feisty personality, she has gained national media attention outside her television and film career because of her involvement in physical altercations, her troubled romantic relationships, as well as her criticism of Islamic Defenders Front (FPI) leader Muhammad Rizieq Shihab.

Early life
Nikita Mirzani was born on 17 March 1986 in Jakarta, Indonesia, as the second child and only daughter of the four children to Mawardi bin Rasyidin (1963–2014) and Julaelah (1967–2009). Her brothers were Edwin Augustinus Ray, Pedro Adrian, and Lintang Fajar Gemuruh. She has two adoptive sisters named Amelia Natadipura and Fitri Salhuteru (b. 1974).

Her father was of Minangkabau ethnicity and worked for PT Krakatau Steel, and her mother was of partial Dutch ancestry.

Personal life
In 2006, Nikita married a man known only as Nasseru, who she later claimed was the son of a prominent member of the House of Representatives (DPR). They were divorced in 2007, with Nikita subsequently claiming her husband was temperamental and a drug addict. From this marriage, Nikita had a daughter Laura Meizani Nasseru Asry, nicknamed Loly, born in 2007.

In 2012, Nikita revealed she had been having an affair with actor and comedian Indra Birowo for almost a year, until Indra's wife found out.

On 11 October 2013, Nikita married Sajad Ukra, a New Zealand citizen who was 10 years her senior. He was born in Iraq, grew up in England and worked as a banker in Singapore. Two months after the wedding, Nikita on 24 December 2013 filed for divorce at South Jakarta Religious Court, but on 15 January 2014, she withdrew her divorce application, and her lawyer said the marital problem had been resolved. On 14 April 2014, Nikita again filed for divorce at South Jakarta Religious Court. The first hearing did not commence until 13 October 2014 because Sajad Ukra was employed and domiciled abroad. On 16 February 2015, South Jakarta Religious Court granted Nikita a divorce from Sajad Ukra. In 2014, Nikita gave birth to a child named Azka Raqila Ukra.

In February 2018, Nikita announced she had married entrepreneur Dipo Latief, the son of Suharto-era manpower minister and tycoon Abdul Latief. One month later, Nikita denied the marriage was serious. On 16 July 2018, Nikita applied for a marriage and divorce, only to withdraw her application on 24 October 2018. The couple had one child, Arkana Mawardi, born in 2019. Nikita filed again for marriage and divorce on 29 November 2019. The marriage and divorce were granted by South Jakarta Religious Court on 7 October 2019. Nikita's lawyer said the marriage and divorce were necessary so that the couple's child would be legitimate and so that Dipo would have to pay "hundreds of millions" of rupiah in child support. Dipo appealed the legality of the marriage at the Supreme Court but lost his appeal. Nikita was later convicted of assaulting Dipo.

Controversies

Assault cases

Sandie sisters 
On 5 September 2012, Nikita was in a fight with three other women at SHY rooftop bar in Kemang, South Jakarta. Nikita claimed her friend Angela Army was stimulating kissing and striptease on the dance floor, prompting sisters Beverly Sheila Sandie and Olivia Mei Sandie to laugh at Army. Nikita said she approached Army and advised her to tone down her dancing to avoid being ridiculed. She said Army responded by striking and choking Beverly, while Olivia attacked Army. Nikita then grabbed and dragged Olivia by the hair and the fight continued from the building's fourth floor to in front of the third floor lift. During the melee, Nikita suffered a cut lip. The Sandie sisters later filed a police complaint, alleging that Nikita had grabbed, punched and kicked them. Their father said the sisters had only been laughing at the sight of a male friend acting like a woman. He said Army felt insulted by the laughter and pulled Beverly's hair, prompting Olivia to get up, only to be attacked by Nikita. Nikita was arrested and tried for assault at South Jakarta District Court. She was held in police custody for 57 days before being released on the condition that she report to police. On 24 April 2013, South Jakarta District Court sentenced her to four months' imprisonment. Nikita appealed to Jakarta High Court, which upheld the guilty verdict and extended her sentence by another month. She then appealed to the Supreme Court, which on 16 April 2014 rejected her appeal. In early 2015, she was required to serve a prison term of 93 days to complete her 150-day sentence.

Bandung fight 
In the early hours of 27 July 2013, Nikita was involved in a physical altercation with a 25-year-old university student, Fitri Sri Handayani alias Fia, during Ramadan at the Golden Monkey bar and restaurant in Bandung, West Java. Both women were injured in the fight and reported each other to police. Fia said she was leaving the venue at 2:30am when a fight started near the entrance, so she curiously approached the melee, only to be punched in the right eye by Nikita. Fia was also allegedly assaulted by Onadio Leonardo, the vocalist of the band Killing Me Inside. Indonesian media reported that Fia had requested "peace money" of Rp300 million from Nikita for the case not to proceed to court. Fia's lawyer denied there had been such a request. The two women on 6 February 2014 jointly withdrew their respective police reports.

Abuse of ex-husband 
On 31 January 2020, Nikita was detained by police in Mampang, South Jakarta, for failing to respond to two police summonses in connection with her alleged assault of her ex-husband Dipo Latief. He had complained she had thrown an ashtray that hit him on the forehead. He also accused her of embezzlement. Nikita went on trial in February 2020. On 15 July 2020, South Jakarta District Court sentenced her to six months in prison for mistreating Dipo. Judges said Nikita's abuse had caused Dipo to suffer injuries. Judges said she need not serve the sentence in jail, as she is a single mother, so she was placed under city arrest on probation for 12 months, during which time she should not commit any crime.

Prostitution sting 
On 10 December 2015, Nikita was arrested by the National Police's Criminal Investigation Unit in an undercover operation that also arrested model Puty Revita and two alleged pimps at Hotel Indonesia Kempinski in Jakarta. The two men arrested were Nikita's manager, Ferry, and a fixer named Onat. Nikita, who was unclothed at the time of the raid, was suspected of being involved in online prostitution. A subsequent police statement said Nikita was a victim of human trafficking by the two pimps. Her arrest stemmed from the earlier arrest of Robby Abbas, who pimped for numerous celebrity women. According to Nikita's lawyer, Nikita had gone to a room at the hotel for a late-night meeting with an insurance sector worker named Cici to discuss some work as an emcee for an event. Cici gave her the room key and told her to meet someone. According to the lawyer, Nikita had earlier bought some clothes at a mall and was trying them on when a man entered the room. Nikita's lawyer also said musician Ahmad Dhani had arranged to meet Nikita at the same time and place, but the meeting was canceled by Dhani. The National Police Criminal Investigation Unit's head of general crimes, Umar Fana, said that by entering the hotel room, Nikita had agreed to "a transaction". He said police confiscated evidence including proof of transfers, underwear, condoms and cellphones. Umar said the price for a date with Nikita is Rp65 million. Nikita later complained that police had lied to her that her arrest would not be covered by the media, as reporters and photographers were waiting when she was led out of the hotel. She denied being a prostitute. The media speculated the arrests were an effort to deflect attention from a political corruption scandal.

'Fake' Tweet insulting military chief 
In October 2017, Nikita was reported to police for allegedly insulting Indonesian Military (TNI) commander General Gatot Nurmantyo in a tweet about the anti-communist propaganda film Pengkhianatan G30S/PKI, which shows the bodies of murdered generals being dumped in a well called Lubang Buaya (Crocodile Hole). On 30 September 2017, a screenshot was shared on social media of Nikita's Twitter account, @NikitaMirzani, with a post stating, "film 'G30S/PKI' kurang seru, seharusnya Panglima Gatot dimasukan ke Lubang Buaya pasti seru (The G30S/PKI film is not exciting, Commander Gatot should also be put in Lubang Buaya, it must be exciting)." Reporters and netizens could not find the tweet on Nikita's Twitter account. Nikita denied writing or deleting the tweet. Her lawyer said the screenshot had been faked and explained that her Twitter posts are made via her Instagram account, which did not contain the post. The tweet screenshot was shared by Young Indonesian Entrepreneurs Association chairman Sam Aliano, Anti-Communist Youth Movement chairman Rahmat Himran, and the Indonesian Islamic Advocates Alliance. Sam Aliano urged the Indonesian Broadcasting Commission to ban Nikita from appearing on television, accusing her of trying to divide the nation. Nikita was also reported to police for slander. Police investigated and deemed there was insufficient evidence to name Nikita a suspect. Nikita later filed a police report against those who had disseminated the tweet for allegedly violating the Information and Electronic Transactions Law. Sam Aliano was declared a suspect for alleged slander of Nikita. In August 2018, he said Nikita had asked him to pay Rp5 billion in return for having his suspect status revoked. He said he suspected Nikita of colluding with police to share the demanded money.

Criticism of Rizieq Shihab 
In May 2017, Nikita criticized FPI leader Rizieq Shihab for his failure to comply with police summonses for questioning over alleged pornography and accused him of "running away". Rizieq, who was declared a suspect in the case on 29 May 2017, had left Indonesia in April 2017 after being summoned for questioning and then stayed in Saudi Arabia for over three years.

In November 2020, Nikita renewed her criticism of Rizieq, following his return to Indonesia after the criminal charges against him were dropped. On her Instagram live account, she said Rizieq, who uses the honorific Habib to signify he is a descendant of the Prophet Muhammad, is a charlatan. "What I know is that habib means tukang obat (medicine man). [Take a] screenshot [of me saying this]. Habib [Rizieq] is a charlatan, don’t glorify him. Prophet Muhammad, He’s clearly a prophet. While this human always makes trouble but he gets a [warm] welcome".FPI supporter and cleric Maaher At-Thuwailibi responded by calling Nikita a lonte (slut), a babi betina (sow) and threatened to spill blood in raiding her house if she failed to apologize within 24 hours. Police deployed officers to guard her house. Nikita refused to apologize and instead offered to feed those who go to her house. She also challenged Rizieq to take a DNA test to prove his assertion that he is a descendant of the Prophet Muhammad. Netizens praised her for her bold remarks. In the East Java capital of Surabaya, images of Nikita were displayed as a symbol of resistance against Rizieq when residents protested against the FPI leader. Political analyst and lecturer Hendri Satrio also noted that Nikita had become a resistance symbol. Nikita said that since gaining viral popularity as a result of her post about Rizieq, she had reaped hundreds of millions of rupiah in endorsements.

Case against Dito Mahendra 
In June 2022, Nikita is charged with violations of Electronic Information and Transactions Law after calling Dito Mahendra, an Indonesian businessman, a "giver of false hope" and a fraudster. Her iPad and her Instagram account has been seized by the police for investigation. On 21 July, she is arrested while shopping at Senayan City, a shopping mall in Jakarta. She was released later as the police considered humanitarian reason, as Nikita had three children.

On 25 October 2022, Nikita was arrested.

Filmography

Film

TV soap operas

Reality TV and talk shows

Discography

Single 
 Baby I Hate You (2012)
 Mau-Maunya (2013)
Kode-Kodean (2016)
Money and Love (OST. Moammar Emka's Jakarta Undercover) (2016)
 Selalu Salah (2020)
 Nikita Gang feat Young Lex (2021)

References

Living people
1986 births
Indonesian female models
Indonesian film actresses